The Belarusian-Polish border is the state border between the Republic of Poland (EU member) and the Republic of Belarus (Union State). It starts from the triple junction of the borders with Lithuania in the north and stretches to the triple junction borders with Ukraine to the south. It is also part of the EU border with Belarus. The border runs along the administrative borders of two Voivodships Podlaskie and Lubelskie in the Polish side and Grodno and Brest Vobłasć in the Belarusian side. In the Polish side, the  section is under the protection of the Podlaskie Border Guard Unit, while the  section is in the operation area of the Bug River Border Guard Unit. Border rivers (from north to south) are Czarna Hańcza, Wołkuszanka, Świsłocz, Narew, and Bug.

History

After the Soviet invasion of Poland in September 1939, the area of West Belarus was annexed into the Byelorussian Soviet Socialist Republic. Five new Voblasts were created: Baranavichy, Belostok, Brest, Pinsk, and Vialejka.

In accordance with the Border Agreement between Poland and the USSR of 16 August 1945, 17 districts of Belastok Voblast of the BSSR including the city of Białystok and 3 districts of Brest Voblast, where a significant number of Belarusians lived, were transferred to Poland.

Following the 1944 agreement on population exchange between Poland and Soviet Belarus, on November 25, 1945, an additional agreement was signed in Warsaw by representatives of the government of the Byelorussian Soviet Socialist Republic and the Government of the National Unity of the Republic of Poland on the registration and evacuation of the Belarusian population from the territory of Poland to the BSSR and Polish population from the BSSR to the territory of Poland. Announcements on registration and extension of the evacuation until June 1946 were posted in Białystok and within the Voivodship.

On August 12, 1944 the Polish delegation met for the first time with their Soviet counterparts, led by Markow - an opponent of any compromises. The Soviets brought a map in the scale of 1:1,500,000 to the meeting, along with a detailed border agreement, both documents bore the signature of Osóbka-Morawski on July 25, 1944. The delimitation continued on August 13. The Polish and Soviet delegations resolved the disputed issues regarding the scale of the maps and agreed a position on the manner of negotiating the points of contention presented by the Poles. The agreement between the PKWN and the BSSR on the evacuation of Polish citizens from the territory of Belarus and the Belarusian population from the territory of Poland, concluded in September 1944, intensified the mixing of various ethnic groups in north-eastern Poland; and yet the war had already caused mass migrations of peoples throughout Europe. People often had to make immediate decisions about staying in their native villages, which were suddenly to be in another country or deciding to repatriate, when only very few Poles knew where the recently formed eastern border of the Białystok Voivodeship is. More than once it happened that the border has divided not only a village in half, but even the farm, so that the house is on the Polish side of the border and the barn on the Soviet (Belarussian) side.  During the negotiations, Poland obtained favorable changes in shifting the border of the Białystok Voivodeship to the east to only 8 kilometers or less. Practically, diplomatic talks regarding the eastern border of the region ended on that day. The original intention of the border negotiations after August 16, 1945 was the exchange of territories between Poland and the USSR on the basis of complete equilibrium. However, as a result of negotiations along the entire eastern border, nine shifts of the border were made by 7 and 1/2 kilometers or less in favor of Poland, land was acquired with a total area of 799 square kilometers. The USSR obtained 11 shifts of 7 kilometers or less in its favor and acquired land with a total area of 565 square kilometers. Poland also undertook to transfer 234 square kilometers of land in East Prussia to the USSR as compensation for 'unequal' exchange on the eastern border. In neighboring Sokółka County, the situation was the same. This county obtained a shift of the border from 200 to 3,000 meters to the east, most of the returned villages were ethnically Polish: Rogacze, Chworościany, Nowdziel, Szymaki, Nomiki, Minkowce, Łapicze, Gobiaty, Usnarz Górny, Jurowlany and Rudaki. The county also acquired the devastated and abandoned areas of the former Jewish settlement of Palestyna, and the village of Grzybowszczyzna inhabited by Belarusians.
Bialystok County territorially benefited from the delimitation carried out by the sixth Subcommittee. First of all, in three locations, near Zaleszany, Bobrowniki and Ozierany, the county obtained a strip with a width of 2 to 5 kilometers. However, this county was characterized by a much more diverse ethnic mosaic than the almost purely ethnic Polish Augustów County or the somewhat ethnically mixed Sokółka County. While Zaleszany was inhabited by the Polish population, Bobrowniki, Chomontowce, Wielkie Oziery and Małe Oziery were 70 to 90% Belarusian.

In 1946, during the refinement of the state border between the USSR and Poland in the Belarusian-Polish section, Krynki, which was entirely granted to Poland, had a point that separated the border section under Sub-Committee V from the activities of Sub-Committee VI. Further, the border ran through areas which Poland lost due to the Soviet dictate, because they were located on the west side of the Curzon Line. This shift was around 12 km (7 miles) in the vicinity of Odelsk, 15 km (10 miles) in the Łosośny area, 20 km (12 miles) in Biała Blota, and 15 km (10 miles) in the area of the Augustów Canal. Polish negotiators during the delimitation procedure realized that they were helpless in the face of these imposed arrangements and were only trying to introduce minor verifications for Poland. Among other things, near Odelsk, within the borders of Poland was the village of the villages of Klimówka, Minkowce, Nomiki, Taki, Tołcze, Szymaki of the Hrodna District and the villages of Todorkowce and Chworosciany of the Sapotskin district were transferred to the Polish People's Republic. Zubrzyca Wielka and Zubrzyca Mała were also recovered, but most of the agricultural lands belonging to these villages remained on Belarusian side of the border.

More to the north, in the area of the village of Nowrowol the border was moved 700-800 metres (about ½ mile) to the east, which also allowed the villages of Tołcze, Szymaki and Klimówka to be part of Poland. In the Gmina Kuźnica, the border line was moved 200-300 metres (about a furlong) to the east and at this place the border was cut across the tracks of the Białystok-Grodno railway line.

Another modification of the border came into force by a treaty signed on May 15, 1948. Kowale, Nowodziel and Łosiniany returned as well according to the treaty  

In August 1948, the TASS agency announced a communication on the completion of delimitation of the border. However, the local authorities determined the final shape of the border and belonging of individual villages or their fragments for more than a year and a half. On the basis of documentation of the Belarusian side, officially announced on July 8, 1950, the Polish side obtained 30 villages as part of exchange and border corrections, while the Belarusian side obtained 12 villages. Also, many villages had been divided. Thereafter, and until now, the border between Poland and Belarus has never changed.

Impact of the new border
The impact of the new border demarcation had a negative influence on the infrastructure and economic activity in the Polish side of the border (Bialystok Voivodeship). this border has cut off or seriously complicated a large part of the rail, road and telecommunications networks. Mainly, but not only, in the counties of Augustów and Sokołka, the border ran against economic and economic logic. Thus, the Białystok-Augustów-Suwałki railway line would remain entirely within the territory of Poland if the Polish-Soviet Mixed Commission for Border Delimitation had drawn the border line as stipulated in the Yalta Agreement.
For example, if Kiełbasy which became part of the BSSR would have been stayed in Poland, this would significantly accelerate the post-war reconstruction from the damage because the Polish State Railways did not resume traffic on the alternative route to Suwałki and Augustów, leading through the until recently German cities of Ełk and Olecko until November 24, 1946. Alternatively, in order to avoid the economically absurd Białystok -Ełk-Olecko-Suwałki-Augustów railway connection, PKP had to build a new railway line (no. 40) from Sokółka to Dąbrowa Białostocka . The new border also cut off various road connections, such as the main paved road from Nowy Dwór to Sejny. This road, remaining in Poland, would significantly facilitate transport between the north-eastern part of the Sokólka County and the south-eastern part of the Augustów County. The location of the new border significantly delayed the reconstruction of these areas, considering the fact that they were heavily forested and that the main road from Augustów to Sejny remained severely damaged and mined until June 1946. telephone and telegraph connections were of great importance. Again, the new frontier severed or significantly complicated the telephone and telegraph connections that had survived the six years of Soviet and German occupation. The telecommunication system suffered as well in May 1946 it was reported that telephone calls between Białystok and Augustów were connected through the exchanges in Grajewo and Suwałki, which meant delays in connections from two to four hours. And just as PKP was forced to build a new section of the railway route, the Ministry of Posts and Telegraphs had to build a new telephone line between Białystok and Augustów solely because of the new border. Communication disruptions manifested themselves in many ways, often communes which formally belonged to one of the pre-war counties annexed by the USSR had no direct connections with the main centers of the new counties. For example, Krynki and Suchowola could connect with Sokółka only through Białystok.   
The new border with the Soviet Union caused an increase in hidden costs in the case of communication, due to the effective failure or inaccessibility of the means of transport and communications: for example, following the demarcation of the border, the road from Sidra to Strzelczyki (following the demarcation it is part of the BSSR) now ended six kilometers from the border in Staworowo, as there is no border crossing to the Soviet Union there. The railway line from Dąbrowa Białostocka to Grodno (the latter became part of the BSSR) had been cancelled. The situation had contributed to the delay in the reconstruction of the voivodeship from the war damage.

2021 dispute 

In August 2021, a wave of illegal immigrants started fleeing through Belarus to Poland. Belarus was accused of hybrid warfare by orchestrating and supporting illegal crossing of the border in forest areas. Poland has recently reinforced the border with 1,000 men and is planning to build a border fence due to a massive influx of immigrants. The Poland–Belarus barrier was completed in June 2022. Over 2000 immigrants tried to illegally cross the Belarus border and 800 were successful, landing in state-run centres issued to aid them, many of which have been waiting near the border for more than a week. Poland's prime minister Mateusz Morawiecki stated that Poland must protect its borders and the people crossing the Polish—Belarusian border are being used by Lukashenko.

On 25 August 2021, the European Court of Human Rights (ECHR) summoned Poland and Latvia to provide the migrants "food, water, clothing, adequate medical care and, if possible, temporary shelter", according to a statement from the court. "The measure will apply for a period of three weeks from today until 15 September 2021 inclusive", with the ECHR judge citing the European Convention on Human Rights, while stating that neither country was ordered to allow the migrants through the border.

On 24 November 2021, the Human Rights Watch reported that thousand of people were stuck at  the border of Belarus and Poland in circumstances that violated human rights and put their lives at risk. Polish officials pushed back those who try to cross while Belarusian officials beat and detained those who return. People have spent days or weeks in the open on the border, without shelter or access to basic humanitarian services, including food and water, resulting in deaths.

On 15 February 2022, OHCHR reported that human rights defenders, including media workers and interpreters face threats and intimidation at the border with Belarus. The organization called on Poland authorities to investigate all allegations of harassment and grant access to journalists and humanitarian workers to the border area ensuring that they can work freely and safely.

Border crossings

See also

References

Further reading

External links

 
1946 establishments in Belarus
1946 establishments in Poland
European Union external borders
1946 in international relations
Borders of Belarus
Borders of Poland
International borders